The Central Breithorn is a peak of the Breithorn range in the Pennine Alps, located on the border between Switzerland and Italy, between the canton of Valais and the region of Aosta Valley. It is located east of the main summit of the Breithorn and west of the western Breithorn Twin.

References

External links
Central Breithorn on Hikr

Alpine four-thousanders
Mountains of the Alps
Mountains of Italy
Mountains of Switzerland
Pennine Alps
Italy–Switzerland border
International mountains of Europe
Mountains of Valais
Four-thousanders of Switzerland